Luis Alcalá Martínez is a Spanish paleontologist.

Biography
Dr. Luis Alcalá is a Spanish Paleontologist. He is the director of Fundación Conjunto Paleontológico de Teruel-Dinópolis, in Teruel, Spain.
He is one of the discoverers of Turiasaurus riodevensis, together with Rafael Royo-Torres and Alberto Cobos.

References 

Living people
Spanish paleontologists
Year of birth missing (living people)